Brayan Moreno may refer to:
 Brayan Moreno (footballer, born 1998)
 Brayan Moreno (footballer, born 1999)